The Bagaya Monastery, located in Inwa, Mandalay Region, Burma (Myanmar) is a Buddhist monastery built on the southwest of Inwa Palace. This magnificent monastery is also known as Maha Waiyan Bontha Bagaya Monastery. During King Hsinbyushin's reign (1763–1776), Maha Thiri Zeya Thinkhaya, town officer of Magwe built the monastery in the Bagaya monastic establishment and dedicated to Shin Dhammabhinanda. It is one of the famous tourists attractions in Burma.

Etymology
Bagaya is a Burmese approximation of Mon language , literally "starflower monastery."

History
During King Bagyidaw (1819–1837), a great fire broke out on 15 April 1821. Many important buildings, including the Bagaya Monastery, were burnt in the fire. The government tried to reconstruct in 1992 and built the new brick building in the place of the old monastery for the use of Buddha image and Pitaka scriptures. It was recorded that the monastery was constructed based on the model of the old monastery.

Architecture

The Bagaya Monastery which consists of the seven-tiered spire has Dhanu hall and Bhawga hall. It also has eight stairways made up of bricks. This weather-worn but magnificent monastery stands in the middle of wide paddy fields, with palms, banana trees and thorny green bushes clustered in profusion around its shady base. The monastery is decorated with splendid Burmese architectural works such as carvings, floral arabesques, the ornamentation with curved figurines and the reliefs of birds and animals as well as small pillars decorated on the wall, the artistic works of Inwa Era.

References

External links

 Photos of Bagaya Kyaung at Have Camera Will Travel

History of Myanmar
Pagodas in Myanmar
16th-century Buddhist temples
Monasteries in Myanmar